Day by Day may refer to:

Books
 "Day by Day", a popular prayer ascribed to Richard of Chichester
 Day by Day (book), a 1973 daily meditation book for alcoholics and addicts

Music
 "Day by Day" (hymn), an 1865 hymn
 Day by Day Entertainment, an American hip hop record label and record distributor

Albums
 Day by Day (Doris Day album), 1956
 Day by Day (EP), a 2012 EP by South Korean girl group T-ara
 Day by Day (Femi Kuti album), 2008
 Day by Day (Fly to the Sky album)
 Day by Day (Hebe Tien album), July 2016
 Day by Day (Yolanda Adams album), 2005
 Day by Day, by Bet.e & Stef
 Day by Day, a series of Beatles bootleg recordings
 Day by Day with Cilla, a 1973 album by Cilla Black
 "Day by Day" (EP), a 2012 EP by T-ara
 Day by Day, a 2022 album by Timothy B. Schmit

Songs
 "Day by Day" (1945 song), a song written by Axel Stordahl, Paul Weston and Sammy Cahn
 "Day by Day" (Godspell song), a 1971 song from the musical Godspell
 "Day by Day" (Big Bang song), 2012 song by Big Bang, also known as "Haru Haru"
 "Day by Day" (Kevin Ayers song), 1974
 "Day by Day" (Regina song), 1997
 "Day by Day", a song by Badmarsh & Shri from the album Signs
 "Day by Day", a song by Dajae
 "Day by Day", a song by DC Talk from Jesus Freak
 "Day by Day", a song by Janis Ian from Night Rains
 "Day by Day", a song by The Hooters from Nervous Night

Other
 Day by Day (webcomic), an American political webcomic by Chris Muir
 Day by Day (American TV series), a 1980s American sitcom
 Day by Day (Soviet TV series)
 Day by Day, a Southern Television news programme
 Day by Day (film), a 1951 Spanish drama film
 Day by Day Christian Ministries, an evangelical Christian organisation based in the Philippines.

See also 
 Day to Day, a 2003–2009 radio programme in the United States
 Day After Day (disambiguation)
 Day to Day
 Daily (disambiguation)